The 1936 Provincial Speedway League was the first season of the Provincial League, introduced as a second tier to the National League Six speedway teams started the season. Cardiff withdrew after 9 matches and their record was expunged, with most of their riders joining Nottingham. Southampton Saints were the champions on race points difference over Bristol Bulldogs.

Due to the brevity of the season, teams also competed for the Provincial Trophy in a league format. Cardiff had only completed one fixture before folding and their record was expunged. West Ham Hawks which was West Ham Hammers' reserve side, also competed, but raced home meetings at Southampton. Southampton Saints won the trophy to complete the double.

Provincial League Final table

M = Matches; W = Wins; D = Draws; L = Losses; Pts = Total Points

Withdrawal (Record expunged) : Cardiff

Leading averages (league only)

Provincial Trophy Final table

M = Matches; W = Wins; D = Draws; L = Losses; Pts = Total Points

Withdrawal (Record expunged) : Cardiff

National Trophy
The 1936 National Trophy was the sixth edition of the Knockout Cup. Southampton Saints won the Provincial Final round and therefore qualified for the quarter finals proper (the round when the tier one sides entered the competition).

Provincial League First Round

Provincial League Final

Final

First leg

Second leg

Southampton were the National Trophy Provincial Final winners, winning on aggregate 73-67.

See also
List of United Kingdom Speedway League Champions
Knockout Cup (speedway)

References

Speedway Provincial League
1936 in British motorsport
1936 in speedway